Kirovsky is an urban-type settlement in Kamyzyaksky District of Astrakhan Oblast, Russia. Population:

References

Notes

Sources

Urban-type settlements in Astrakhan Oblast